Somali may refer to:

Horn of Africa
 Somalis, an inhabitant or ethnicity associated with Greater Somali Region
 Somali language, a Cushitic language
 Somali culture
 Somali cuisine
 Proto-Somali, the ancestors of modern Somalis
 Somali, plural of Somalo, former Somali currency
 Somali Plate, a tectonic plate which covers the eastern part of Africa
Somalia, a nation in the Horn of Africa 
 Somaliland, a self-declared state considered internationally to be a part of Somalia
 Somali Region, a Somali-inhabited region of Ethiopia
 North Eastern Province (Kenya), a Somali-inhabited region of Kenya

Other uses
 Somali, a member of the Somalia Battalion, a pro-Russian military group.
 , a British destroyer
 Somali cat, a cat breed
 Somali, a character in the manga series Somali and the Forest Spirit
 Somali Peninsula, a region of East Africa, also known as 'The Horn of Africa'

See also

 Proto-Somali, an ancient people

Language and nationality disambiguation pages